The Accidents is a Swedish  Punk-band, that formed in 2002. The band has released 3 fullength albums, several eps and singles on different labels, one of them is Burning Heart Records. The band has toured around Sweden, Europe  and USA

Discography

Album 
 2004 - All Time High (CD/LP, Bootleg Booze Records/Rock Alliance)
 2005 - Poison Chalice (CD/LP, Bootleg Booze Records/Burning Heart Records)
 2007 - Summer Dreams (CD, Burning Heart Records)

EP 
 2002 - Debut EP (7", Devils Shitburner Records)
 2002 - The Accidents (EP)|The Accidents (10", Diapazam Records)
 2009 - Stigamata Rock'n'Rolli (10", Bootleg Booze Records)
 2009 - The Beechcraft Bonanza + Frutti Di Bosco (CD, Nicotine Records)

Single 
 2004 - Dead Guys (7", Bootleg Booze Records)
 2004 - Performing Three Spectacular Hits (7", Idle Hands Records)
 2004 - Dannelly Field Airport (7", Incognito Records)
 2004 - Cisse (7", Bridge of Compassion Records)
 2005 - Let's Go Out Tonight (7", Broken Hope Records)
 2007 - Hot Hot City (7", Zorch Productions)
 2009 - Frutti Di Bosco (7", Tornado Ride Records)

Members
 Rickard Alriksson
 Fred Tank
 Dan Wall

Past members
 Kim Belly
 Jallo Lehto
 Omega

References

External links
Homepage

Swedish punk rock groups
Musical groups established in 2002
Culture in Örebro
2002 establishments in Sweden